Kol Torah is a yeshiva in the Bayit Vegan neighborhood of Jerusalem.

History 
Yeshivas Kol Torah was founded in 1939 by Yechiel Michel Schlesinger (1898–1948), born in Hamburg, Germany and Boruch Kunstadt, a dayan from Fulda, Germany. It was the first mainstream Haredi yeshiva to teach in Hebrew, as opposed to Yiddish, as was accepted at the time. This innovation had the crucial support of the Chazon Ish.
  

After Schlesinger's death in 1949, Kol Torah was headed by Shlomo Zalman Auerbach, until his death in 1995.

Moshe Yehuda Schlesinger, eldest son of the founder, is currently serving as rosh yeshiva. Kol Torah is separated into two parts, the rabbinical college and the high school. The number of students in both combined reaches around 1000 students.

Notable faculty members 
 , son in law of Shlomo Zalman Auerbach.
 , chief disciple of Elazar Shach and Jerusalem Faction leader.

 , author of Birkas Avrohom.

  (1943–1997).

 Yehoshua Neuwirth (1927-2013), author of Shemirat Shabbat Kehilchatah.

Notable alumni 

 Avi Berkowitz (born 1988), American attorney and political adviser

 Pinchas Biberfeld (1915–1999), Chief Rabbi of Munich

 Meir Kessler, rabbi of Modi'in Illit

 Israel Meir Lau (born 1937), Ashkenazi Chief Rabbi of Israel (1993–2003)

 Norman Lebrecht (born 1948), British commentator on music and cultural affairs, and novelist

 Nachum Neriya (born 1941), son of Moshe-Zvi Neria and founder of Torah Betziyon

 Yehoshua Neuwirth (1927 - 2013), author of Shemirat Shabbat Kehilchatah

 Shmuel Rabinovitch (born 1970), rabbi of the Western Wall and the Holy Sites of Israel

 Daniel Sperber (born 1940), Professor of Talmud at Bar-Ilan University

 Chaim Walder (c. 1969-2021), author of Haredi children's literature who committed suicide after a rabinnical court concluded he had sexually abused dozens of women, girls, and boys.

 Yitzhak Shlomo Zilberman (1929-2001), founder of Yeshivat Aderet Eliyahu; pioneer of the Zilberman Method in Jewish education

References

Ashkenazi Jewish culture in Jerusalem
German-Jewish culture in Jerusalem
Haredi Judaism in Israel
Haredi yeshivas
Educational institutions established in 1939
Orthodox yeshivas in Jerusalem
1939 establishments in Mandatory Palestine